Jaan Piiskar (11 February 1883, in Vastemõisa Parish (now Põhja-Sakala Parish, Kreis Fellin – 19 December 1942, in Sevurallag, Sverdlovsk Oblast, Russian SFSR) was an Estonian educator and politician.

From 1931 until 1932 he was Minister of Education and Social Affairs.

Piiskar was a member of the I, II, III, IV and V Riigikogu. Following the Soviet occupation of Estonia in 1940, Piiskar was arrested by the NKVD in Tallinn and placed within the Gulag camp system. Piiskar died in custody in 1941.

References

1883 births
1942 deaths
People from Põhja-Sakala Parish
People from Kreis Fellin
Estonian Socialist Revolutionary Party politicians
Estonian Independent Socialist Workers' Party politicians
Estonian Socialist Workers' Party politicians
Government ministers of Estonia
Members of the Estonian Constituent Assembly
Members of the Riigikogu, 1920–1923
Members of the Riigikogu, 1923–1926
Members of the Riigikogu, 1926–1929
Members of the Riigikogu, 1929–1932
Members of the Riigikogu, 1932–1934
Estonian educators
Estonian people who died in Soviet detention
People who died in the Gulag
Education and Social affairs ministers of Estonia